Fukkk Offf, born Bastian Heerhorst, is a German DJ and producer, whose song "Rave Is King" reached the top of German club charts. He has released one album, Love Me Hate Me Kiss Me Kill Me, under the Coco Machete Records record label. It debuted on 8 June 2009 and included his previous singles "Rave Is King" and "I'm a Freak." 
 
His song "Bl00dfuck" was used in an advertisement for the British television program Skins.
The single "Rave Is King" was also used several times in the 2014 movie Who Am I.

The songs "Bang Your Head" and "Pacific Coast Highway" are contained in the soundtrack of the Netflix series, The Umbrella Academy.

Discography

Albums

Singles and EPs

Miscellaneous

Credits

Remixes

Production

References

External links
 discogs.com Fukkk Offf discography
 soundcloud.com Fukkk Offf on Soundcloud

German DJs
Living people
Year of birth missing (living people)
Electronic dance music DJs